Exploding head syndrome (EHS) is an abnormal sensory perception during sleep in which a person experiences auditory hallucinations that are loud and of short duration when falling asleep or waking up. The noise may be frightening, typically occurs only occasionally, and is not a serious health concern. People may also experience a flash of light. Pain is typically absent.

The cause is unknown. Potential organic explanations that have been investigated but ruled out include ear problems, temporal lobe seizure, nerve dysfunction, or specific genetic changes. Potential risk factors include psychological stress. It is classified as a sleep disorder or headache disorder. People often go undiagnosed.

There is no high-quality evidence to support treatment. Reassurance may be sufficient. Clomipramine and calcium channel blockers have been tried. While the frequency of the condition is not well studied, some have estimated that it occurs in about 10% of people. Women are reportedly more commonly affected. The condition was initially described at least as early as 1876. The current name came into use in 1988.

Signs and symptoms 
Individuals with exploding head syndrome hear or experience loud imagined noises as they are falling asleep or waking up, have a strong, often frightened emotional reaction to the sound, and do not report significant pain; around 10% of people also experience visual disturbances like perceiving visual static, lightning, or flashes of light.  Some people may also experience heat, strange feelings in their torso, or  a feeling of electrical tinglings that ascends to the head before the auditory hallucinations occur.  With the heightened arousal, people experience distress, confusion, myoclonic jerks, tachycardia, sweating, and the feeling that they have stopped breathing and need to make a conscious effort to breathe again.

The pattern of the auditory hallucinations is variable. Some people report having a total of two or four attacks followed by a prolonged or total remission, having attacks over the course of a few weeks or months before the attacks spontaneously disappear, or the attacks may even recur irregularly every few days, weeks, or months for much of a lifetime.

Causes 
The cause of EHS is unknown. A number of hypotheses have been put forth with the most common being dysfunction of the reticular formation in the brainstem responsible for transition between waking and sleeping.

Other theories into causes of EHS include:
 Minor seizures affecting the temporal lobe
 Ear dysfunctions, including sudden shifts in middle ear components or the Eustachian tube, or a rupture of the membranous labyrinth or labyrinthine fistula
 Stress and anxiety
 Variable and broken sleep, associated with a decline in delta sleep
 Antidepressant discontinuation syndrome
 Temporary calcium channel dysfunction
 PTSD

Exploding head syndrome was first described in the 19th century, and may have first been mentioned in the 17th century. Despite evidence of EHS across the centuries, some individuals hold the belief that EHS episodes are not natural events, but are the effects of directed energy weapons which create an auditory effect.  Thus, EHS has been worked into conspiracy theories, but there is no scientific evidence that EHS has non-natural origins.

Diagnosis

Classification
Exploding head syndrome is classified under other parasomnias by the 2014 International Classification of Sleep Disorders (ICSD, 3rd.Ed.) and is an unusual type of auditory hallucination in that it occurs in people who are not fully awake.

According to ICD-10 and DSM-5 EHS is classified as either other specified sleep-wake disorder (codes:780.59 or G47.8) or unspecified sleep-wake disorder (codes: 780.59 or G47.9).

Treatment 
, no clinical trials had been conducted to determine what treatments are safe and effective; a few case reports had been published describing treatment of small numbers of people (two to twelve per report) with clomipramine, flunarizine, nifedipine, topiramate, carbamazepine. Studies suggest that education and reassurance can reduce the frequency of EHS episodes.  There is some evidence that individuals with EHS rarely report episodes to medical professionals.

Epidemiology
There have not been sufficient studies to make conclusive statements about how common or who is most often affected. One study found that 14% of a sample of undergrads reported at least one episode over the course of their lives, with higher rates in those who also have sleep paralysis.

History
Case reports of EHS have been published since at least 1876, which Silas Weir Mitchell described as "sensory discharges" in a patient. However, it has been suggested that the earliest written account of EHS was described in the biography of the French philosopher René Descartes in 1691.  The phrase "snapping of the brain" was coined in 1920 by the British physician and psychiatrist Robert Armstrong-Jones.  A detailed description of the syndrome and the name "exploding head syndrome" was given by British neurologist John M. S. Pearce in 1989. More recently, Peter Goadsby and Brian Sharpless have proposed renaming EHS "episodic cranial sensory shock" as it describes the symptoms more accurately and better attributes to Mitchell.

References

Further reading

External links

Sleep disorders
Sleep physiology
Lucid dreams
Neurological disorders
Syndromes of unknown causes
Parasomnias
Syndromes affecting the nervous system
Wikipedia medicine articles ready to translate